Cimahi Putra Football Club (simply known as Cimahi Putra Kabomania) is an Indonesian football club based in Cimahi, West Java. They currently compete in the Liga 3.

References

External links

Cimahi
Sport in West Java
Football clubs in Indonesia
Football clubs in West Java
Association football clubs established in 2021
2021 establishments in Indonesia